Alkmaarderhout, locally known as "De Hout" (Dutch for "the wood(s)"), in a city park in Alkmaar, North Holland, Netherlands. The park is one of the oldest city parks in the Netherlands, dating from 1607.

References
 Alkmaars groene verleden (The green history of Alkmaar) Municipality Alkmaar (2012)

Parks in North Holland